Vencedor (Eng.: Victorious) is the title of a studio album released posthumously by Mexican norteño performer Valentín Elizalde. This album became his first number-one entry on the Billboard Top Latin Albums, and was released in a standard CD presentation and as a CD/DVD combo.

Track listing
The track listing from Billboard and Allmusic.

CD

DVD
Y Se Parece A Ti
Si Me Ven
Vete Con Él
Volveré a Amar
Los Pájaros
La Más Deseada
Aunque Te Enamores
Nada
Soy Así
Ébrio de Amor
La Gallina Ponedora
Como Me Duele

Personnel
This information from Allmusic.
Valentin Elizalde — Producer
Carlos Luna — Mastering, mixing
Noe Sepulveda — Engineer
Fortunato Moreno T. — Graphic design, art direction, photography, creative consultant

Chart performance

Year-End Charts

Sales and certifications

References

2006 albums
Valentín Elizalde albums